Corley is a surname and occasional given name. Notable people with the name include:

 Al Corley, American actor, singer and producer
 Annie Corley (born 1952), American actress 
 Carl Corley, US born author and illustrator
 Catherine Corley, later Catherine Corley Anderson (1909–2001), American writer of children's books
 Charlene Corley, American defense contractor
 Christopher A. Corley (born 1980), American politician
 DeMarcus Corley, boxer from Washington D.C.
 Donald Corley (1886–1955), American author of short stories, illustrator and architect
 Edwin Corley (1931–1981), United States novelist
 Elizabeth Corley (born 1956), investment executive
 Eric Corley, prominent figure in the hacker community, often known as Emmanuel Goldstein
 Hal Corley, American television writer, playwright, and theatre director
 Harry Corley (1878–1936), Irish cricketer
 Joe Corley, American karate and kickboxing competitor
 John Thomas Corley (1914–1977), U.S. Army general
 John D.W. Corley, U.S. Air Force general
 The Fantastic Johnny C, born Johnny Corley, American soul singer
 Ken Corley (1920–1984), American basketball player
 Manuel S. Corley (1823–1902), US House of Representatives member from South Carolina
 Quentin Durward Corley (1884–1980), Texas circuit judge
 Pat Corley (1930-2006), American actor
 Ray Corley (1928–2007), American basketball player
 Roy F. Corley (1874–1953), American politician 
 W. Gene Corley (1935-2013), American structural engineer
 Catherine Corley Anderson, American writer of children's books
 Corley Ellis, American politician
 Denys Corley Smith (1922–1989), British author and journalist

See also

Curley